Kambula, Khambula or (Zulu Nkambule) is a town located at  in the KwaZulu-Natal Province of South Africa.

It is the location where the Battle of Kambula was fought in 1879, the result of which was a British Empire victory over the Zulu people.

References

Populated places in the eDumbe Local Municipality